Number One is a 1969 American sports drama film released by United Artists and directed by Tom Gries.

The film stars Charlton Heston as Ron "Cat" Catlan, aging quarterback for American professional football's New Orleans Saints, and Jessica Walter as his wife. Musician Al Hirt plays himself, as do several real-life members of the 1968 Saints. The football scenes were shot at the Saints' then-home field, Tulane Stadium.

Plot
Ron "Cat" Catlan once led the New Orleans Saints to a championship and is heralded by his teammates, coaches, and sportswriters as an all-time great quarterback. After fifteen years in pro football, his skills have declined and he struggles with repeated injuries, though he continues to believe that he is the best in the game. Cat tries to compensate for his failing skills with booze and an extramarital affair. ("You're not even worth the price of a ticket anymore", a fan yells at him after Cat refuses her an autograph.)

Friend and former teammate Richie Fowler (Bruce Dern) offers Cat a job with his auto-leasing company, and a management position in the computer industry is also on the table, but Catlan hesitates, insisting he can still lead the squad to future glory. The associate with the computer firm (Bobby Troup) warns him not to put off making a decision: "There are a lot of kids coming out of college, Cat, and they're smart kids. A year from now, I might not be able to offer you a job driving the company truck."

Things are no better at home for Catlan: his long-suffering wife, Julie (Jessica Walter), threatens to leave him after too many booze-fueled outrages and late nights with other women. She begins to drift away into her own life, leading Cat to an abortive affair with Ann (Diana Muldaur).

Cat finally begs Julie to stay, saying everything will be alright after he leads the Saints to another title. In the next game, against the Dallas Cowboys, Catlan succeeds in leading the Saints down the field, even scoring a touchdown himself. In the end, though, he is crushed in a violent sack by three Cowboys players, seemingly ending his football career (and possibly his very life, as Catlan takes what appears to be his last breath). Julie, unable to watch, is seen leaving the stadium.

Filming
Despite having All-Pro signal-caller Billy Kilmer as an instructor, Charlton Heston did not make a very convincing pro quarterback. "I marveled at how skinny he was in a Saints uniform", said local DJ Bob Walker, who was an extra in the movie. "It hung on him like a cheap suit three sizes too big. When the cameras weren't rolling we watched him try to throw some passes. His receiver was 10-20 yards away and his alleged passes didn't come close." Joe Wendryhoski, who basically played himself in the film as the Saints center, called Heston "a great guy, very sociable" who unfortunately "didn't have an athletic bone in his body. As a quarterback, he left a lot to be desired."

In the final scene when Catlan is crushed by the Dallas defense (actually portrayed by Saints players Mike Tilleman, Dave Rowe, and Fred Whittingham), neither Heston nor the producer felt the hit on him was realistic enough, so Heston asked them to cut loose to really make it look authentic. On the second take, the trio slammed the actor to the ground, breaking three of his ribs.

Reaction
Number One was a commercial failure, but critical reaction was mixed.  The film, and particularly Heston's performance, did earn a rave review from Howard Thompson of The New York Times, who called the "consistently engrossing" film, "...a succinct, stinging and often strong gridiron drama...."  Thompson described Heston's performance as "a brooding, scorching and beautifully disciplined tour de force for the actor....If Heston could have been better, we don't know how."

Production
Plans for the film were announced in 1966 to be made by the same team as The War Lover.

The National Football League permitted the New Orleans Saints' name and jerseys to be used, as opposed to many football films featuring professional teams with fictional names. However, this lead to historical inaccuracies in the film, particularly in flashbacks of Catlan's career. One flashback scene shows Catlan's first game as a rookie for the Saints in what would've been the early 1950s, however, the Saints were founded in 1966 and began play the following season. Another flashback shows Catlan and the team celebrating a championship victory, however, the Saints did not win a championship at any point before the film was shot (or indeed, for several decades afterwards, their first title coming in 2010 at Super Bowl XLIV, nearly a half-century after the film was made).

The music was composed by Dominic Frontiere, future husband of Los Angeles Rams owner Georgia Frontiere.

Number One was released on VHS in the early 1980s, but was quickly deleted; MGM finally released the film on DVD on November 12, 2015.

See also
 List of American films of 1969

References

External links

New York Times review by Howard Thompson
Radio spots on YouTube

1969 films
1969 drama films
1960s sports drama films
American sports drama films
American football films
1960s English-language films
Films directed by Tom Gries
Films scored by Dominic Frontiere
Films shot in New Orleans
New Orleans Saints
United Artists films
1960s American films